Copelatus basilewskyi is a species of diving beetle. It is part of the genus Copelatus in the subfamily Copelatinae of the family Dytiscidae. It was described by Bilardo & Pederzani in 1979.

References

basilewskyi
Beetles described in 1979